Cychreides (Ancient Greek: Κυχρειδης) is a fabled dragon, or serpent, from Greek mythology. It is named after Cychreus, the Greek demigod who either raised or killed it, depending on the version of the story being told.

Mythology
Cychreus, son of Poseidon, either:

 Fought a dragon/serpent that was terrorizing the island of Salamis, and upon slaying it was made king.
Raised a dragon/serpent as a pet, before he became ruler of Salamis. It went on a rampage, and was driven away or captured by Eurylochus, who gave it to Demeter, a goddess who then kept it for her own.
 Was known as "the dragon" for his hot-headed nature, and terrorized the island of Salamis  until driven off by Eurylochus, but was received at Eleusis by Demeter, who made him her high priest.

Notes

Greek dragons

References 

 Apollodorus, The Library with an English Translation by Sir James George Frazer, F.B.A., F.R.S. in 2 Volumes, Cambridge, MA, Harvard University Press; London, William Heinemann Ltd. 1921. ISBN 0-674-99135-4. Online version at the Perseus Digital Library. Greek text available from the same website.
Stephanus of Byzantium, Stephani Byzantii Ethnicorum quae supersunt, edited by August Meineike (1790-1870), published 1849. A few entries from this important ancient handbook of place names have been translated by Brady Kiesling. Online version at the Topos Text Project.
Strabo, The Geography of Strabo. Edition by H.L. Jones. Cambridge, Mass.: Harvard University Press; London: William Heinemann, Ltd. 1924. Online version at the Perseus Digital Library.
 Strabo, Geographica edited by A. Meineke. Leipzig: Teubner. 1877. Greek text available at the Perseus Digital Library.

Characters in Greek mythology
Ancient Salamis